Neil Creek is a stream in the U.S. state of Oregon. It is a tributary to Bear Creek. Neil Creek was named in 1854 after Clairborne Neil, a pioneer and early resident of Ashland, Oregon.

References

Rivers of Oregon
Rivers of Jackson County, Oregon